Sushil Chandra (born 15 May 1957) is a 1980 batch Indian Revenue Service officer. He was the 24th  Chief Election Commissioner of India. He previously served as the Chairperson of the Central Board of Direct Taxes.

Personal life

Sushil Chandra was born on 15 May 1957 in Chandausi UP. He completed B-Tech from Roorkee University and LLB from DAV College, Dehradun. He has also attended various trainings at IMF, Indian Institute of Management Bangalore and The Wharton School on management.

Career

He started his career in the Indian Engineering Service. Later joined the 1980 Batch of the Indian Revenue Service.
 
Under his chairmanship of the Central Board of Direct Taxes he contributed greatly to the Operation Clean Money.

He has been Commissioner of Income Tax (Appeals) International Taxation, Delhi. He was also the Director of Investigation, Mumbai and Director General Investigation, Gujarat.
 
On 15 February 2019, he was appointed as the Election Commissioner of India and took office as the Chief Election Commissioner of India on 13 April 2021.

He has been involved in 16 elections including five as chief election commissioner. He retired on 14 May 2022, Rajiv Kumar succeeded him.

References

Indian civil servants
Members of the Election Commission of India
Living people
Indian Revenue Service officers
1957 births
Chief Election Commissioners of India
IIT Roorkee alumni